Joana Isabel de Alvim Rodrigo Pereira Ribeiro (born 25 March 1992 in Lisbon) is a Portuguese actress.

Biography
Joana Ribeiro was born on 25 March 1992 in Lisbon, Portugal to an engineer father and veterinarian mother. She studied first at the Luís Madureira School in Alfragide, and then completed secondary studies in Lisbon. Ribeiro initially studied architecture, but changed her focus to acting. She signed with an agency, Lisbon Elite, and played in the short film Herança do Silêncio (Silent Inheritance).

Ribeiro's breakout role was as Mariana Côrte-Real in the telenovela Dancin' Days for the SIC. Her next role was in another SIC telenovela, Sol de Inverno (Winter Sun). She was cast as Susan Delgado in Amazon Prime Video's cancelled 2020 The Dark Tower series.

Internationally, she's acted in The Man Who Killed Don Quixote (2018) by Terry Gilliam, Fatima (2020) by Marco Pontecorvo (in which she played Our Lady of Fátima), Infinite by Antoine Fuqua (2021) and The Man Who Fell to Earth by Alex Kurtzman and Jenny Lumet (2022). 

She was one of the 10 Shooting Stars at the Berlin Film Festival in 2020.

Selected filmography

Citations

External links
 Subtitle Talent
 

Living people
1992 births
Actresses from Lisbon
Portuguese television actresses
Portuguese film actresses
Portuguese female models
21st-century Portuguese actresses